The women's 3000 metres steeplechase at the 2013 World Championships in Athletics was held at the Luzhniki Stadium on 10–13 August.

No Kenyan or Ethiopian had won the Women's Steeplechase at the World Championships.  It became quickly obvious that was going to change.  From the gun the three Kenyans and the three Ethiopians formed a pack that separated from the rest of the field.  At the beginning of the 6th lap Sofia Assefa, running at the back of the back, tripped over a barrier and fell, losing several seconds to the field.  She got back up and tried to catch back up to the pack.  Hyvin Kiyeng Jepkemoi was the first to fall out the back, passed by Assefa.  But Milcah Chemos Cheywa and Lydiah Chepkurui were on the front of train, stringing out the Ethiopians.  Chemos, running determined after two successive bronze medals, led out the final lap, with Assefa chasing her teammates.  Chemos held her slight lead all the way to the finish.  Assefa caught Hiwot Alayew just before the water jump and continued to gain on Chepkurui.  At the last barrier it looked like Assefa had the momentum to go by, but she seemed to lose a step after landing, Chepkuri ran away to the silver and Assefa making an impressive comeback to get bronze.

Records
Prior to the competition, the records were as follows:

Qualification standards

Schedule

Results

Heats
Qualification: First 5 in each heat (Q) and the next 5 fastest (q) advanced to the final.

Final
The final was held at 21:25.

References

External links
3000 metres steeplechase results at IAAF website

steeplechase
Steeplechase at the World Athletics Championships
2013 in women's athletics